The Watsonia Sporting Club is an Australian rules football club located in Watsonia, Victoria that currently competes in Division 2 in the Northern Football Netball League. 

Watsonia is located 15.2 km north east of Melbourne and has a population of 8739 circa 2006.

History of the Watsonia Football Club

The club was established in 1967.

1967 to 1968 Panton Hill Football League
1969 to 1980 Diamond Valley Football League
Diamond Valley Football League split into two divisions for the 1981 season with the bottom four clubs at end of 1980 season and four other clubs affiliating from other competitions forming the lower tier.
1981 to 2006 Diamond Valley Football League Second Division
2007 to 2010 Northern Football League Second Division
2011 to 2012 Northern Football League Third Division
2016 – present Northern Football Netball League Second Division

Whilst always competitive, the club has not been consistently strong, the club won its only  premiership the 1987 DVFL second division against Reservoir Lakeside. The club declined promotion to the first division due to uncertainty about player strength and financial stability. It is the only DVFL club to ever refuse a promotion.

2022 - Moved from AK Lines Reserves to Binnak Park.

Teams

The Watsonia Sporting Club currently fields Senior Mens Football, Reserves and Under 19’s as well as Netball teams in the Northern Football Netball League.

Premierships

Seniors

Reserves

Thirds

League Best & Fairests

League Leading Goalkickers

Junior League Best & Fairests

Watsonia Football Club Best & Fairest Awards

Seniors

Reserves

Under 19s

Under 17s

Watsonia Football Club Leading Goalkickers

References

External links
 Watsonia Sporting Club Website
 Northern Football League Website

Northern Football League (Australia) clubs
Australian rules football clubs established in 1967
1967 establishments in Australia
Sport in the City of Banyule
Australian rules football clubs in Melbourne